Lauren Janine Henry (born 30 June 1988) is a former South African figure skater. Henry began her career in 1994 and ended it in 2006. She was the 2000 Under 14 National Champion, 2003 Novice Champion, as well as the 2004 Junior National Champion.

Personal life
Henry was born in Durban, South Africa to Gordon and Jean Henry, and has one older brother. She attended Virginia Preparatory School followed by Danville Park Girls High School. At the age of fourteen, Lauren and her father moved to Johannesburg, where she then attended Bryanston High School and graduated in 2005. After high school, she moved to London, England for two years, and as of June 2008 currently resides in Vancouver, British Columbia, Canada where she is pursuing a career in singing and writing.

Competitive highlights

References

External links
 Lauren Henry at LinkedIn

South African female single skaters
Sportspeople from Johannesburg
Sportspeople from Durban
Figure skaters from Vancouver
1988 births
Living people